Ross Thomas Lyons (born 8 December 1984) is a Scottish cricket player. He is a left-handed batsman and a slow left-arm orthodox spin bowler. He made his first-class cricket debut on 11 May 2006, for Scotland against Namibia in the 2006–07 ICC Intercontinental Cup.

He made his debut for the Scottish national team on 26 August 2005 in a totesport league match against Derbyshire. He has played 61 times for Scotland in all formats, including 25 One Day Internationals, his first match at that level coming on 27 June 2006 against Pakistan. He has also represented Scotland at Under-15, Under-17, Under-19 and Under-23 level. He played for SNCL Club East Kilbride bowling slow left arm spin and batting around the middle order, and was their player of the year 2016–17. Lyons then signed for his current club, Uddingston, in April 2017.

References

Scotland One Day International cricketers
Scotland Twenty20 International cricketers
Scottish cricketers
1984 births
Living people
Cricketers from Greenock